Pseudociliate (su-do-sil-i-A-ta) is made of two roots, One Greek and one is Latin. Pseudos (ψευδής) in Greek means false, cilium in Latin means eyelash.  

It refers to a type of cells which are covered by small coordinated flagella (cilia), but unrelated to the Harosan group called the Ciliata.

Cell anatomy